Miriam Butt is Professor of Linguistics at the Department of Linguistics (Fachbereich Sprachwissenschaft) at the University of Konstanz.  She is best known for her theoretical linguistic work on complex predicates and on grammatical case, and for her computational linguistic work in large-scale grammar development within the ParGram project.

Butt earned her doctorate in linguistics in 1993 at Stanford University.  She subsequently held research and teaching positions at the Institut für Maschinelle Sprachverarbeitung at the University of Stuttgart, University of Manchester Institute of Science and Technology and the University of Tübingen before taking up her current position at the University of Konstanz.  She is the author or editor of 11 books, including The Structure of Complex Predicates in Urdu and the Theories of Case volume in the Cambridge Textbooks in Linguistics series.  Her Pargram work in large-scale grammar development focuses on grammars for English, German, and Urdu.

Butt is also one of the authors of 6000 Kilometer Sehnsucht, which describes her childhood in Saudi Arabia and Pakistan.

References

Selected additional publications
Butt, Miriam & Aditi Lahiri. 2013. Diachronic pertinacity of light verbs. Lingua. 
Butt, Miriam & Tafseer Ahmed. 2011. The redevelopment of Indo-Aryan case systems from a lexical semantic perspective. Morphology 21(3): 545-572.

External links
 Miriam Butt's home page
 ParGram project

German women academics
Linguists from Pakistan
Living people
1966 births
Place of birth missing (living people)
German people of Pakistani descent
Members of Academia Europaea
Linguists of Indo-Aryan languages
Linguists of Urdu
Linguists of Hindi
Linguists of German